The 2005 Big 12 men's basketball tournament was the postseason men's basketball tournament for the Big 12 Conference. It was played from March 10 to 13 in Kansas City, Missouri at Kemper Arena.  won the tournament for the 2nd time and received the conference's automatic bid to the 2005 NCAA tournament.

Seeding
The Tournament consisted of a 12 team single-elimination tournament with the top 4 seeds receiving a bye.

Schedule

Bracket

All-Tournament Team
Most Outstanding Player – Joey Graham, Oklahoma State

See also
2005 Big 12 Conference women's basketball tournament
2005 NCAA Division I men's basketball tournament
2004–05 NCAA Division I men's basketball rankings

References

External links
Official 2005 Big 12 Men's Basketball Tournament Bracket

Big 12 men's basketball tournament
Tournament
Big 12 men's basketball tournament
Big 12 men's basketball tournament
College sports tournaments in Missouri